"She Never Cried in Front of Me" is a song co-written and recorded by American country music singer Toby Keith. It was released in July 2008 as the first single for his 2008 album That Don't Make Me a Bad Guy. For the week of November 1, 2008, the song has become Keith's 17th number one hit on the US Billboard Hot Country Songs chart. Keith wrote this song with Bobby Pinson.

Content
The song is a mid-tempo ballad in which the narrator watches his former lover getting married. Upon doing so, he sees her crying, which makes him think of "all the hell" he put her through when they were together, thinking that nothing was wrong with her, because she "never cried in front of [him]".

Bobby Pinson wrote the song with Keith at Keith's house in mid-2007. According to Pinson, he sat down at Keith's piano and the two started working on the song there. According to Keith, it was the first time that he ever sat down at a piano to write a song, and he thought that it "changed everything. It brought a whole new approach to the melody."

Critical reception
The song received a "thumbs down" review from the country music site Engine 145. Reviewer Brady Vercher stated that the "lyric fleshes out too many irrelevant details that end up creating all sorts of logical fallacies", and that the song was generally over-produced. He also considered it derivative of fellow artist Tracy Lawrence's 1994 hit "I See It Now", which also features a storyline based on a man's realization of "all the hell" he has put a former lover through. Kevin John Coyne of Country Universe gave the song an A-minus, saying that Keith "sings the hell out of" the song, but criticizing the "arena rock" production of the chorus.

Chart performance

Year-end charts

Certifications

References 

2008 singles
2008 songs
Country ballads
2000s ballads
Toby Keith songs
Songs written by Bobby Pinson
Songs written by Toby Keith
Show Dog-Universal Music singles